The Human Rights Law Alliance is a body associated with the Australian Christian Lobby (ACL) focusing on what are stated as freedoms neglected by the Australian Human Rights Commission, such as: 'freedom of speech, freedom of religion, freedom of conscience and freedom of association'.
Seed funding was provided by the ACL.

Campaigns and cases
The HRLA was active in the campaign against same sex marriage in Australia.

Jointly with the ACL, HRLA lodged a submission to the Australian Senate Select Committee on the 'Exposure Draft Of The Marriage Amendment (Same-Sex Marriage)' Bill.

People
 John Steenhof, Managing Director
 Martyn Iles, resigned as Managing Director, February 2018 to become Managing Director of the Australian Christian Lobby (ACL)
 Christopher Brohier, Consulting Barrister
 David Burr, Chairman
 Jim Wallace, Board Member

References

External links

Non-profit organisations based in the Australian Capital Territory
Christian political organizations
Anti-abortion organisations in Australia
Organizations established in 2016
2016 establishments in Australia
Human rights organisations based in Australia
Political advocacy groups in Australia
Christian organisations based in Australia
Legal organisations based in Australia